Allan William Thomas "Alan" Crawford (21 January 1916 – 28 March 1988) was an Australian rules footballer who played with North Melbourne in the Victorian Football League (VFL).

Career 
Crawford, a former Carlton seconds player, had a stop-start career in the VFL, starting with a stint from 1936 to 1938. During the early war years he played for South Adelaide, then went back to North Melbourne in 1943. A follower, Crawford won North Melbourne's best and fairest award in 1944. He was playing coach of Launceston in 1946 and coached another Tasmanian club, Penguin, in 1947, before returning to North Melbourne in 1948, for two final seasons.

References

1916 births
1988 deaths
North Melbourne Football Club players
Syd Barker Medal winners
Penguin Football Club players
Launceston Football Club players
Launceston Football Club coaches
South Adelaide Football Club players
Australian rules footballers from Victoria (Australia)
People from Nathalia, Victoria
Australian Army personnel of World War II
Australian Army soldiers